Maternal instinct may refer to:
 The maternal bond that forms between a mother and her child
 "Maternal Instinct" (Stargate SG-1), a 2000 episode from the American-Canadian TV series Stargate SG-1
 "Maternal Instinct" (Danny Phantom), an episode of the American animated television series Danny Phantom